York Haven Dam is a low head, run-of-the river, dam and hydroelectric plant on the Susquehanna River, United States. When the dam was completed in 1904, it was the third largest in the world.

The major axis of the  diversion dam is north to south and connects to a  headrace which heads southeast.  The dam and headrace are laid out along natural rock formations in the river.  The south eastern end is on the "western" bank at York Haven.  The north end lands at Three Mile Island. There is a smaller dam and fish passage further up the east side of Three Mile Island that completes the crossing to the eastern bank of the river. 
 
The hydroelectric plant is at the south eastern end near the western bank of the river. The dam is situated in three municipalities in three separate counties: Londonderry Township, Dauphin County; Conoy Township, Lancaster County; and York Haven Borough, York County.

The hydroelectric plant generates  of power.  The plant has 13 horizontal generators that generate between 1000 and 1200 kW each.  There are seven vertical generators that generate between  apiece.  Six of the vertical units use S. Morgan Smith Kaplan turbines.  The plant uses one of the first Kaplan turbines installed in the United States, which is listed as a National Historic Mechanical Engineering Landmark.

The plant's FERC license runs through November 30, 2055.

The York Haven Hydro Project was formerly owned by Cube Hydro Partners, LLC, a portfolio company of I Squared Capital. In 2019, Cube Hydro was purchased from I Squared Capital by Ontario Power Generation. OPG merged Cube Hydro with another company that it acquired in 2018, forming Eagle Creek Renewable Energy, which is the current operator of the York Haven Hydro Project.

See also 

List of dams and reservoirs of the Susquehanna River

References 

Map of York Haven Dam area

Dams completed in 1904
Energy infrastructure completed in 1904
Dams in Pennsylvania
United States power company dams
Hydroelectric power plants in Pennsylvania
Buildings and structures in Dauphin County, Pennsylvania
Buildings and structures in Lancaster County, Pennsylvania
Buildings and structures in York County, Pennsylvania
Run-of-the-river power stations
Dams on the Susquehanna River